Phoenix theophrasti, the Cretan date palm, is a palm native to the eastern Mediterranean, with a very restricted distribution, confined to southern Greece, a few sites on Crete and nearby islands, as well as some places on the Turkish coast. In Europe, with Chamaerops humilis (European fan palm) are the unique native palm trees in continental Europe. In Turkey, it is the only native palm species; all the others—although much more common—were introduced.

The specific epithet theophrasti was chosen by the Swiss botanist Werner Greuter in 1967 for the fact that Theophrastus, the ancient Greek "father of botany", had described several types of palms, including one from Crete.

A genomic study from New York University Abu Dhabi Center for Genomics and Systems Biology showed that domesticated date palm varieties from North Africa, including well-known varieties such as Medjool and Deglet Noor, are a hybrid between Middle East date palms and P. theophrasti.

Description
Apart from the usually inedible dates and upright fruit clusters, the Cretan species can appear quite similar to the cultivated date (Phoenix dactylifera).

Phoenix theophrasti grows up to 15 m tall, usually with several slender stems. The leaves are pinnate, 2–3 m long, with numerous rigid greyish-green linear leaflets 15–50 cm long on each side of the central rachis. Dead leaves are marcescent, remaining attached to the stem for years after withering. The fruit is an oval yellowish-brown drupe 1.5 cm long and 1 cm diameter and containing a single large seed. The fruit pulp is too thin and fibrous to be of agricultural significance and has an acrid taste, though the fruits are sometimes eaten by the locals.

Distribution
Sites on Crete include Vai in the Lasithi Prefecture, Ayios Nikitas in Heraklion Prefecture, and Preveli gorge and Souda near Plakias, both on the south coasts of Crete in Rethymnon Prefecture. Trees are also found on Amorgos island, on Halki Island, and on the south coast of Anafi island. Recently, around 10 trees, the only natural stand on the mainland, were found in an ancient palm forest in the Epidaurus area in Peloponnese. It has been proposed that its range was much more widespread in ancient Greece, growing from Crete to Thebes and from the Peloponnese to Delos.

Its presence in Turkey was not described scientifically until the 1980s. There are four stands in southwest Turkey, especially on the Datça and Bodrum Peninsulas in Muğla Province and in Kumluca-Karaöz in Finike Bay. The plants form a grove in the village of Gölköy in northern Bodrum are considered by some as a subspecies, having a shorter stem (4–8 m) but longer fruit stalks (.6–2 m).

Areas forested with Phoenix theophrasti and Chamaerops humilis constitute Europe's only palm forests.

The biggest palm forests of Europe are in fact Vai in Crete and the Palmeral of Elche in Spain.

References and external links

Davis, P. H., ed. (1965-1985). Flora of Turkey. Edinburgh.
Phoenix theophrasti – information, genetic conservation units and related resources. European Forest Genetic Resources Programme (EUFORGEN)

theophrasti
Flora of Crete
Trees of Europe
Trees of Turkey
Near threatened plants
Plants described in 1967